Inuvik Boot Lake is a territorial electoral district for the Legislative Assembly of the Northwest Territories, Canada.

Together with Inuvik Twin Lakes, it is one of two electoral districts that represent Inuvik; both were created in 1999 from the previous monolithic Inuvik riding.

Geography 
Inuvik Boot Lake borders Inuvik Twin Lakes to the northwest, west and southwest, bounded by Centennial Street, Reliance Street, Franklin Road, Distributor Street and Water Street. Inuvik Boot Lake is named for Boot Lake in the south of the electoral district.

History
The 2011 election marked the first time that voters in Inuvik Boot Lake actually voted in a territorial election since the 1999 election, as in both 2003 and 2007 the only candidate was Floyd Roland, who was returned by acclamation.

Members of the Legislative Assembly (MLAs)

Election results

2019 election

2015 election

2011 election

2007 election

In this election, no other candidate registered to run for this riding, so Floyd Roland was returned by acclamation.

2003 election

In this election, no other candidate registered for this riding, so Floyd Roland was returned by acclamation.

1999 election

In the 1999 election, the main issue territory-wide was the question of native self-government and control over the Northwest Territories' resources. The Legislative Assembly of the Northwest Territories runs on a consensus government model, so no political parties exist; although some groups have attempted to revive a partisan legislature, to date such attempts have failed.

References

External links 
Website of the Legislative Assembly of Northwest Territories

Northwest Territories territorial electoral districts
Inuvik